Abigail Izquierdo Ferreira (1 June 1922 – 13 February 2019), known as Bibi Ferreira, was a Brazilian actress, singer, and director. In a career spanning more than 75 years, Ferreira directed and performed in numerous theatrical productions and was recognized as one of the great divas of Brazilian music.

Early life 
Ferreira was born in Rio de Janeiro, the daughter of stage actor Procópio Ferreira and Argentine dancer Aida Izquierdo, born in Buenos Aires. Her paternal grandparents came from Madeira Island, Portugal; her maternal grandparents, Antonio Izquierdo and Irma Queirola, were from Spain. She learned dance at Teatro Municipal in Rio de Janeiro.

Career 
Her father invited his daughter to join his company. She made her stage debut performing La Locandiera at Teatro Serrador in Rio de Janeiro, on 28 February 1941. She formed her own company three years later. During this period, she began hosting several talk and variety television shows, giving new artists and playwrights the opportunity to present their work.

In 1962, she was cast in the Brazilian production of My Fair Lady, which set a Brazilian record for its -year run. She then played leads in Hello Dolly and Man of La Mancha. In the 1970s, she began directing her own productions. Ferreira began performing in a musical about Édith Piaf in 1983, and toured the show through Europe.

Ferreira was a prominent figure in the Brazilian entertainment industry. Her protégé, singer Maria Bethânia, said of Ferreira, "Everything she does has helped Brazil with its identity." The French Government awarded her the Ordre des Arts et des Lettres in 1985. In 2016, Ferreira appeared in "Bibi Times Four", a one-woman show at Symphony Space in New York City.

Later life and death 
In 1968, Ferreira married Paulo Pontes, a playwright. In 1970, she performed in Gota D'Agua, a play Pontes wrote. Pontes died in 1976. Ferreira died in Rio de Janeiro on February 13, 2019, from a cardiac arrest.

References

External links 

Interview With Bibi Ferreira at Forbes

1922 births
2019 deaths
Actresses from Rio de Janeiro (city)
Brazilian people of Portuguese descent
Brazilian people of Argentine descent
Brazilian people of Spanish descent
Brazilian musical theatre actresses
Brazilian stage actresses
Brazilian theatre directors
Women theatre directors
Recipients of the Ordre des Arts et des Lettres
20th-century Brazilian actresses
21st-century Brazilian actresses